The Saryk are a tribe of Turkmens in Turkmenistan. The Saryk mostly live in the valley of the Marghab River (the ancient Margiana).

Etymology
Suggestions for the etymology of Saryk (also Sarik, Saryq) are the Middle Turkic saryγ ("yellow") or the Kipchak root saryq ("sheep").

History 
In the early 19th century the Saryk lived in the Merv region, but from 1830 they were driven further up the Marghab valley by the Teke. Bala Murghab and the Panjdeh became their main settlements. 

In 1881, the Saryk came under Russian control after the Battle of Geok Tepe and the creation of the Transcaspian Oblast. In 1885, the Saryk population was estimated at 65,000.

They continued under Russian rule through the Soviet period. Today most live in modern Turkmenistan, with some living over the borders in Iran and Afghanistan.

Art and culture
Like other Turkmen tribes, the Saryk are known as carpet-makers and have their own distinctive style: dark red-brown carpets with the pattern picked out in fine, thin lines. They use a symmetrical (Turkish) knot, like the Yomut do. The Saryk are also famed for their jewellery.

See also

References 

Ethnic Turkmen people
Ethnic groups in Turkmenistan
Turkmen tribes